Idaho Territory's at-large congressional district is an obsolete congressional district that encompassed the area of the Idaho Territory, which was originally created from parts of the Washington Territory and Dakota Territory in 1863. In 1864, parts of the territory were ceded back to the Dakota Territory and another part was reorganized into the Montana Territory. The boundaries of the territory were changed again in 1868 when the Wyoming Territory was created.

After Idaho's admission to the Union as the 43rd state by act of Congress on July 3, 1890, this district was dissolved and replaced by Idaho's at-large congressional district.

List of members representing the district 
On March 3, 1863, an act of Congress gave Idaho Territory the authority to elect a Congressional delegate, although the first delegate did not take his seat until 1864.

References

Former congressional districts of the United States
At-large United States congressional districts
Territory At-large
1864 establishments in Idaho Territory